Nora Dunn (born April 29, 1952) is an American actress and comedian. Dunn first garnered widespread popularity during her tenure as a cast member on the NBC sketch comedy series Saturday Night Live from 1985 to 1990. Following her departure from SNL, she played Dr. Reynolds in The Nanny from 1998 to 1999, and she has originated the role of Muriel in Home Economics since 2021.

Early life
Dunn was born in Chicago, Illinois, the daughter of Margaret (née East), a nurse, and John Dunn, a musician and poet. Her brother is actor Kevin Dunn, and sister is Cathy Zimmerman. She was raised in a Catholic family, and has Irish, English, Scottish, and German ancestry.

Career

Saturday Night Live
Dunn joined SNL in 1985 with the return of Lorne Michaels as executive producer. The 1985–1986 season proved to be a ratings disaster, and she was one of only five cast members who was not fired at its end (the others were newcomers Jon Lovitz, A. Whitney Brown, Dennis Miller and longtime featured player Al Franken).

Dunn's characters included half of "The Sweeney Sisters" lounge act alongside Jan Hooks, as well as talk show host Pat Stevens (which became a popular recurring role starting in the low-rated 1985–1986 season), melodramatic French hooker Babette, and film buff Ashley Ashley from the "Actors on Film" sketch from the 1985–1986 season. Her impressions included Ann Landers, Imelda Marcos, Liza Minnelli, Tyne Daly, Joan Baez, Martina Navratilova, and Cokie Roberts.

Dunn made headlines in 1990 when she, along with original musical guest Sinéad O'Connor, boycotted an episode that was hosted by comedian Andrew Dice Clay because they found his misogynistic humor offensive. Looking back on the incident ahead of SNL's 40th anniversary, she explained, "Lorne said, 'Andrew Dice Clay was a phenomenon worth examining.' And yeah, he was a phenomenon, but if you’re going to examine him, he shouldn’t be the host, you should write an article. We didn’t examine the hosts of "SNL." We supported them, we wrote for them, and we made them look good. Otherwise you’d never get a host. You’re there to make them look good […] My objection to Andrew Dice Clay was that his character was only about one thing: abusing women and laughing about abusing women. There was nothing else behind it. There was nothing else about it except to make him look harmless."

Recurring characters on SNL
 Ashley Ashley, a pretentious film critic from the recurring sketch, "Actors on Film" (her partner was Jimmy Chance, played by Robert Downey, Jr.)
 Babette, a melodramatic French prostitute
 Pat Stevens, a model turned talk show host
 Denise Venetti, host of "Learning To Feel"
 Dr. Norma Hoeffering, a lesbian psychiatrist who writes male-bashing self-help books
 Liz Sweeney, one of two singing sisters (the other played by Jan Hooks)
 Loose Chang, Ching Chang's (Dana Carvey) love interest
 Mrs. Campbell, Wayne Campbell's (Mike Myers) mom

Celebrity impersonations

Ann Landers
Imelda Marcos
Liza Minnelli
Tyne Daly
Martina Navratilova
Cokie Roberts
Jeane Dixon
Jeane Kirkpatrick
Joan Baez
Brigitte Nielsen
Bette Davis
Catherine Deneuve
Donna Rice
Barbara Bush
Cindy Adams
Barbara Merrill
Leona Helmsley
Linda Dano
Peggy Lee
Shelley Duvall
Marilyn Quayle
Pat Schroeder
Linda Ellerbee
Mary Hart
Raisa Gorbacheva
Frida Kahlo

Other work
Dunn appeared in recurring roles on Sisters from 1993–1996 and The Nanny from 1998–1999, as well as a guest-starring role in a two-part episode of The X-Files in 1998. In the 8th episode of the 9th season of crime procedural drama Bones, she played author Tess Brown, a feuding rival of protagonist Temperance Brennan.
In 2015 she appeared in the fourth season of New Girl. In 2009 Dunn played the sister-in-law of Frank Reynolds in It's Always Sunny in Philadelphia.

Her film work includes Working Girl (1988), How I Got into College (1989), Miami Blues (1990), I Love Trouble (1994), Shake, Rattle and Rock! (1994), the Last Supper (1995), Three Kings (1999), What's the Worst That Could Happen? (2001), Zoolander (2001), Max Keeble's Big Move (2001), Bruce Almighty (2003), Runaway Jury (2003), The Hebrew Hammer (2003), Love for Rent (2005), Pineapple Express (2008), My Suicide (2009), LOL (2012), Entourage (2015) and The Lost Husband (2020).

In 2014, Dunn began appearing in a series of commercials for Clorox. She has also been a storytelling contributor to Chicago's Under the Gun Theater.

Personal life
Dunn is a fan of the Chicago Bears of the National Football League and the Chicago Blackhawks of the National Hockey League.

Filmography

Television

Film

References

External links
 

1952 births
20th-century American actresses
21st-century American actresses
Actresses from Chicago
American film actresses
American sketch comedians
American television actresses
American voice actresses
American women comedians
Comedians from Illinois
Living people
School of the Art Institute of Chicago alumni
20th-century American comedians
21st-century American comedians